Sir James Alexander Swettenham  (1846 – 19 April 1933) was a British colonial administrator who was Governor of British Guiana (1901–1904) and Governor of Jamaica (1904–1907).

Early life
Alexander was born the son of James Oldham Swettenham, an attorney-at-law, near Belper, Derbyshire and educated at Clare College, Cambridge.

Family
Alexander’s younger brother, Sir Frank Athelstane Swettenham, was also a colonial administrator.

Alexander married Mary Emily Copeland, a descendant of the Staffordshire Wedgwood family. They had no children.

Career
Alexander joined the Ceylon Civil Service in 1868 and worked there until 1883, before being appointed Receiver-General for Cyprus in 1884, returning to Ceylon in 1891 where he was appointed the 20th Accountant General and Controller of Revenue in Sri Lanka. His appointment commenced on 31 July 1891, succeeding G. T. M. O'Brien, and he held the office until 10 June 1895, when he was succeeded by J. A. Taylor.  Alexander moved to Singapore on 11 February 1895 and served as the Colonial Secretary until 1899, becoming acting Governor that year, when Sir Charles Mitchell died in office, until handing over to his brother Frank in November 1901.

From 1901 to 1904 he served as Governor of British Guiana before moving to Jamaica to become Governor there. In 1907 there was a severe earthquake on the island and he was responsible for dealing with its aftermath. When a corps of American marines arrived under Rear-Admiral Charles H. Davis Jr to offer assistance he asked them to leave as he had matters under control. The Americans took offence and caused a diplomatic spat referred to as the Kingston Incident, as a result of which Swettenham was obliged to resign his position.

Death
Alexander died in a clinic in La Colline, Switzerland and was buried in Vevey.

Honour
Alexander was awarded CMG in 1892 and was knighted KCMG in 1898.

References

External links
 

1846 births
1933 deaths
People from Belper
Alumni of Clare College, Cambridge
Auditors General of Sri Lanka
British colonial governors and administrators in Asia
British colonial governors and administrators in the Americas
Governors of British Guiana
Governors of Jamaica
Knights Commander of the Order of St Michael and St George
Chief Secretaries of Singapore
Governors of the Straits Settlements
Administrators in British Singapore